The Speedies were a power pop band popular in the New York City area. Their 1979 song, "Let Me Take Your Photo," was featured in a Hewlett Packard commercial and on The Tonight Show with Jay Leno. Members included Gregory Crewdson and John Carlucci.

References

American power pop groups
Musical groups from New York City